The Man Who Knew Too Little is a 1997 spy comedy film starring Bill Murray, directed by Jon Amiel, and written by Robert Farrar and Howard Franklin. The film is based on Farrar's 1997 novel Watch That Man, and the title is a parody of Alfred Hitchcock's 1934 film The Man Who Knew Too Much and his 1956 remake of the same title.

Plot
Wallace Ritchie flies from Des Moines, Iowa, to London, United Kingdom, to spend his birthday with his brother, James. James is not expecting the visit and is hosting a business dinner that night; to keep Wallace entertained, he sets him up with an interactive improv theatre business, the "Theatre of Life", which promises to treat the participant as a character in a crime drama. Before the night begins, James hands Wallace a pair of Ambassador cigars, promising to "fire them up" before midnight in celebration of Wally's birthday. Wallace answers a phone call intended for a hitman at the same payphone that the Theatre of Life uses for its act.

The contact, Sir Roger Daggenhurst, mistakes Wallace for Spencer, the hitman he has hired and Wallace assumes the identity. The real Spencer picks up the phone call meant for Wallace and murders one of the actors, prompting a police investigation. Daggenhurst, his assistant Hawkins, British Defense Minister Gilbert Embleton, and Russian intelligence agent Sergei plan to detonate an explosive device (hidden in a Matryoshka doll) during a dinner between British and Russian dignitaries, in order to rekindle the Cold War and replace their aging technology.

Still believing he's acting with the Theatre of Life, Wally meets Lori, Embleton's call-girl. Lori plans to blackmail Embleton for a substantial amount of money using letters that detail the plot. Spencer was hired to eliminate her and destroy the letters. Wallace scares off Embleton when he arrives to look for them and drives off Spencer. Fearing their plot will be revealed, Daggenhurst hires two more hitmen, while Sergei hires now-inactive spy Boris "The Butcher" Blavasky to eliminate "Spencer". Boris succeeds in killing the real Spencer, but Wallace and Lori return, retrieving the letters.

Using Spencer's communicator, Wallace mentions lighting up some "big Ambassadors, at 11:59," referring to James' cigars. Thinking the words refer to the assassination plot, both sides believe he is an American spy who has caught on to their scheme. Daggenhurst offers Wallace and Lori 3 million British pounds in return for the letters, to be exchanged at the same hotel where the dinner is taking place. This is a ruse to capture and kill them both. All the while Wallace gets close to his "co-star" Lori, who confesses she'd love to study acting once they're paid.

Wallace contacts James and tells him to meet him at the hotel – soon after, James sees an evening news report that Wallace has murdered an actor and police are searching for him, prompting James to abandon the business dinner. Wallace and Lori are caught and held captive. Boris opts for torture by Dr. Ludmilla Kropotkin, but Wallace and Lori separate and escape before she arrives. James is captured and sent to be tortured by Dr Kropotkin. Wallace evades the hitmen and finds himself part of a group of Russian folk dancers performing for the ambassadors. During the routine, he sees the Matryoshka doll bomb, unwittingly disarms it seconds before it goes off, blocks a poison dart from Boris with it, and steals the show with his improvised dancing.

Realizing their plot has failed when the bomb fails to go off, Sergei and Daggenhurst bring out two bags containing the promised £3 million for Wallace and Lori and release James, who is exhausted but otherwise fine after his torture session. Boris congratulates Wallace for his impressive covert skills and gives him a souvenir pistol, telling Wallace he will continue his butcher shop business. Sergei and Daggenhurst attempt to escape with half the money and discover Wallace's doll, which they believe is only a normal one he picked out for himself. They are proven wrong when they realign the doll, reactivating the bomb and blowing them up, just as Wallace and Lori share a kiss.

Some time later, on an exotic beach, Wally unwittingly incapacitates a spy, passing a test by an unknown American espionage group. Believing he is capable of being a top agent, they offer him a position on "the team". Thinking that they wish to make him a movie star, Wallace accepts their offer.

Cast

Production 
The story and script were derived from the novel Watch That Man by the film's co-writer Robert Farrar. Farrar got the idea from a chance remark at a dinner party. Farrar said, "Somebody told me about these strange live theater performances which were all the rage in England in the '80s. The idea was to telephone for instructions if you wanted to take part. My immediate reaction was, 'Wouldn't it be fabulous if somebody got the wrong number, and it all went hopelessly wrong?'"

Filming took place at a variety of London locations, including Three Mills Studios in London's East End and Elstree Film Studios.

Release 
Released to theaters nationally and internationally on November 14, 1997, The Man Who Knew Too Little was financed by Regency Enterprises and distributed by Warner Bros.

Box office 
On its opening weekend, the film grossed $4.6 million and placed at the No. 5 spot, behind the films The Jackal, Starship Troopers, Disney's re-release of The Little Mermaid, and Bean. It ultimately grossed $13.7 million worldwide.

Reception

On review aggregator Rotten Tomatoes, the film has an approval rating of 37% based on reviews from 38 critics.

Lawrence Van Gelder of The New York Times called The Man Who Knew Too Little "another movie high on concept and low on execution." Gelder continued, "Yearning to combine the lunatic spirit of the Pink Panther, the panache of James Bond and the suspense of Hitchcock, this comedy turns out to be a one-joke movie executed in routine fashion [...] the plotting relies heavily on misinterpreted words, like ambassador (actually the cigars, not the envoys), port (the wine, not the harbor), gone (not dead but departed), that probably convey more humor on the page than on the screen." Van Gelder concluded, "Neither an inspired physical comedian nor the beneficiary of clever lines, genuinely inventive situations or intensifying suspense, Murray rides through the silliness of 'The Man Who Knew to Little' mainly on a funnyman reputation established 13 years ago in 'Ghostbusters'".

Michael Wilmington of the Chicago Tribune wrote, "'The Man Who Knew Too Little' is a movie where almost everything seems to go wrong, beginning with the title. An obvious takeoff on 'The Man Who Knew Too Much' -- the name of the twice-filmed Alfred Hitchcock thriller (1934 and 1956) about an ordinary family plunged accidentally into international intrigue -- the title is awkward, silly and unoriginal. Just like this movie. Despite a good cast and director (Jon Amiel of 'Sommersby' and TV's 'The Singing Detective')...the writers take a half-baked premise and clumsily retool it into a Murray vehicle. But they've cheated their star. Here, it isn't Murray who seems trapped where he doesn't belong, but the whole movie. Terminally unfunny, lazily unsuspenseful, uncertainly directed and full of good but stranded actors, [the film] isn't just a 'wrong man' comedy thriller. It's the wrong movie. For Murray and for us."

In 2010, Nathan Rabin of The A.V. Club reviewed the film and said that "it doesn’t aspire to do anything more than wring some cheap laughs out of a preposterous premise. In that respect, its success is directly equivalent to its extremely modest ambition."

References

External links

 
 
 
 

1997 films
1997 comedy films
1990s American films
1990s English-language films
1990s spy comedy films
American spy comedy films
English-language German films
Films about games
Films based on British novels
Films directed by Jon Amiel
Films produced by Arnon Milchan
Films scored by Christopher Young
Films set in England
Films shot at Elstree Film Studios
Films with screenplays by Howard Franklin
German spy comedy films
Regency Enterprises films
Warner Bros. films
1990s German films